Aleksandra Ishimova (Russian: Алекса́ндра Ио́сифовна (О́сиповна) Иши́мова) ( – ) — was a Russian translator, and one of the first professional Russian children's authors.

Biography
After childhood in her birthplace of Kostroma, Aleksandra Ishimova studied in private boarding schools in Saint Petersburg. In 1818 a scandal involving her father occurred, and Ishimova left Saint Petersburg together with her family to live in the northern provinces. In 1825 it was possible to return to Saint Petersburg, and to receive from Tsar Alexander I a pardon for her father. There she opened a small school and made acquaintance with Pyotr Vyazemsky, Vasily Zhukovsky and Alexander Pushkin. Ishimova was the last correspondent of Pushkin: he wrote her a letter with an enthusiastic response to her historical stories, and sent a book for translation the day of his duel with Georges-Charles de Heeckeren d'Anthès.

Ishimova published two monthly journals: Little Star («Звездочка», 1842—1863) for children, and Rays of Light («Лучи», 1850—1860) for young ladies. Her book History of Russia in Stories for Children («История России в рассказах для детей» 1841) was awarded the Demidov Prize in 1852. Aside from this she translated and printed a number of novel narratives for children, many included religious and moral education. The best known among them were «Рассказы старушки» (Saint Petersburg, 1839); «Священная истории в разговорах для маленьких детей», passing six editions beginning in 1841; «Колокольчик», (Saint Petersburg, 1849) for children in orphanages; «Первое чтение и первые уроки для детей» (Saint Petersburg, 1856—1860; two editions); and «Рассказы из Священной истории для крестьянских детей» (Saint Petersburg, 1878). She died at age 76 in Saint Petersburg.

See also

References

1805 births
1881 deaths
Russian children's writers
Demidov Prize laureates
Russian women children's writers
Writers from Saint Petersburg
19th-century women writers from the Russian Empire
19th-century writers from the Russian Empire
Burials at Nikolskoe Cemetery